is a Japanese footballer who plays for Veertien Mie.

Club statistics
Updated to 23 February 2020.

References

External links

Profile at Kagoshima United FC

1994 births
Living people
National Institute of Fitness and Sports in Kanoya alumni
Association football people from Nagasaki Prefecture
Japanese footballers
J3 League players
Japan Football League players
Kagoshima United FC players
Artista Asama players
Veertien Mie players
Association football defenders